Sweet Toof is the pseudonymous name of a well-known United Kingdom graffiti and street artist. Sweet Toof works as both a solo artist and in collaboration with others, including in the "Burning Candy" crew (including crew-mates "Tek 33", "Cyclops" and "Rowdy").

Career 
According to an interview, he began tagging at age 13, saving up 50p lunch money and buying cheap spray cans to go out at night, before evolving to the more distinctive work for which he has become well known, and eventually going on to study and graduate with a master's degree from the Royal Academy of Arts.

2010–2011 commercial success and international recognition 

Sweet Toof was selected as one of the "cutting edge artists" representing London for Cirque du Soleil's "Safewalls" Art Project in 2011. His work is represented by the Victoria and Albert Museum collection and featured in their "Street Art Contemporary Prints" exhibition in 2010, alongside other well-known street artists including Banksy.

International recognition also came around 2010–2011, when Sweet Toof was invited and showcased in a number of significant International exhibitions and street art projects, including "Dead Letter Playground" at Leo Kesting Gallery in New York (2010), "Project Amsterdam Street Art" (ASA All Stars) at Go Gallery in Amsterdam (2011), and "Dark House" at Factory Flesh in New York (2011).

Sweet Toof is represented by High Roller Society.

Meaning of mouth, teeth and gum imagery 
According to an account by Olly Beck, Sweet Toof looked at himself in a looking glass "in crisis after a messy break-up", with the enlarged and distorted imagery of the "crescents of teeth", the "visible part of our skeletal frame" as a reminder of mortality. Beck relates Sweet Toof's concerns and imagery with the 16th-century Northern European "Vanitas" tradition of reminding of the transience and vanity of life, and to the Mexican celebration of skull imagery to accepting, honouring and celebrating death as part of the life trip.

Sweet Toof's own comments seem to uphold this interpretation, and he has discussed, "To get one's teeth into things, before it's too late." Elsewhere he notes, "Teeth can be really sexy, or aggressive, but they're also constant reminders of death. They're how we get recognised by police when there's nothing else left."

References

External links
 Official website

British graffiti artists
Year of birth missing (living people)
Living people